"Poles 1469" is a song by American rapper Trippie Redd featuring fellow American rapper 6ix9ine. Written alongside producer Pi'erre Bourne, it was released as a music video on April 27, 2017, as the second single from Trippie's debut mixtape A Love Letter to You (2017).

Critical reception
Trevor Smith of HotNewHipHop regarded the song a highlight from A Love Letter To You and praised Trippie Redd's vocals, writing that "his sweet, stuttered delivery sounds perfectly at home on Pi'erre's dreamy soundscapes, and acts as a stark contrast to Tekashi's harsh delivery."

Music video
The official music video was released on April 27, 2017. It is set in a desert setting.

Charts

Certifications

References

2017 singles
2017 songs
Trippie Redd songs
6ix9ine songs
Songs written by Trippie Redd
Songs written by 6ix9ine
Songs written by Pi'erre Bourne